Ethel Tobach (November 7, 1921 – August 14, 2015) was an American psychologist known for her work in comparative and peace psychology.

Early life and education
Tobach was born on November 7, 1921 in Miaskovka, Ukrainian Soviet Socialist Republic, which was then part of the Soviet Union. Both of Tobach's parents were Jewish, which led to them and their daughter having to flee the country to avoid pogroms soon after Tobach was born. They initially fled to Palestine, but after Tobach's father died when she was nine months old, she and her mother moved to Philadelphia in the United States. Tobach and her mother lived in Philadelphia until they moved to Brooklyn, New York when Tobach was ten years old. She became interested in psychology after enrolling at Hunter College in 1937. She received her B.A. from Hunter College in 1949, graduating Phi Beta Kappa. She then enrolled at New York University (NYU), where she received her M.A. in 1952 and her Ph.D. in 1957 under the supervision of T. C. Schneirla.

Career
After taking one of Schneirla's comparative psychology classes at NYU, in which she got an A, Tobach persuaded Schneirla to give her a job at the American Museum of Natural History. She would continue to work at the American Museum of Natural History for the rest of her career. During her career, she also served on the faculty of NYU, Hunter College, the CUNY Graduate Center, and Yeshiva University.

Positions in learned societies
In 1964, she was a co-founder of the Animal Behavior Society. In 1972, she became vice president of the New York Academy of Sciences. In 1983, she and Gary Greenberg founded the International Society for Comparative Psychology. She subsequently served as the Society's first president. In 1984, she was named president of the American Psychological Association (APA)'s Division of Comparative and Physiological Psychology, holding this position until 1985. She was the president of the Eastern Psychological Association from 1987 to 1988. In 2004, she served as president of the APA's Division of Peace Psychology.

Honors and awards
Tobach received the Society for the Psychological Study of Social Issues' Kurt Lewin Award, the society's most prestigious award, in 1993. In 2003, she received the APA's Gold Medal Award for Life Achievement in Psychology in the Public Interest.

Personal life and death
Tobach married Charles Tobach, a photojournalist, in 1947; he subsequently persuaded her to apply to the Ph.D. program in psychology at NYU. She died in her sleep on August 14, 2015 in Wayland, Massachusetts.

References

External links
Ethel Tobach at Jewish Women's Archive
Ethel Tobach at Psychology's Feminist Voices

1921 births
2015 deaths
Soviet emigrants to the United States
American women psychologists
20th-century American psychologists
Comparative psychologists
Hunter College alumni
New York University alumni
American Museum of Natural History
New York University faculty
Yeshiva University faculty
Russian Jews
Peace psychologists
American women academics
Soviet expatriates in Mandatory Palestine
21st-century American women